Ravelsbach is a municipality in the district of Hollabrunn in Lower Austria, Austria.

Geography
Ravelsbach lies in the Weinviertel in Lower Austria. Only about 4.25 of the municipality is forested.

References

Cities and towns in Hollabrunn District